This is a list of Canadian films which were released in 1997:

See also
 1997 in Canada
 1997 in Canadian television

External links
Feature Films Released In 1997 With Country of Origin Canada at IMDb

1997
1997 in Canadian cinema
Canada